John Rackham (26 December 168218 November 1720), commonly known as Calico Jack, was an English pirate captain operating in the Bahamas and in Cuba during the early 18th century. His nickname was derived from the calico clothing that he wore, while Jack is a nickname for "John".

Rackham was active towards the end (1718–1720) of the "Golden Age of Piracy". He is most remembered for having two female crew members: Mary Read and his lover, Anne Bonny.

Rackham deposed Charles Vane from his position as captain of the sloop Ranger, then cruised the Leeward Islands, Jamaica Channel and Windward Passage. He accepted the King's Pardon in 1719 and moved to New Providence, where he met Anne Bonny, who was married to James Bonny at the time. He returned to piracy in 1720 by stealing a British sloop and Anne joined him. Their new crew included Mary Read, who was disguised as a man at the time. After a short run, Rackham was captured by Jonathan Barnet, an English privateer, in 1720, put on trial by Sir Nicholas Lawes, Governor of Jamaica, and hanged in November of that year in Port Royal, Jamaica.

Early life and career
Little is known of Rackham's upbringing or early life, except that he was English and born around 1682. The first record of him is as quartermaster on Charles Vane's brigantine Ranger in 1718, operating out of New Providence island in the Bahamas, which was a notorious base for pirates known as the "Pirates' republic". Vane and his crew robbed several ships outside New York City, then encountered a large French man-of-war. The ship was at least twice as large as Vane's brigantine, and it immediately pursued them. Vane commanded a retreat from battle, claiming caution as his reason. Jack Rackham quickly spoke up and contested the decision, suggesting that they fight the man-of-war because it would have plenty of riches. In addition, he argued, if they captured the ship, it would place a much larger ship at their disposal. Of the approximately ninety-one men on the ship, only fifteen supported Vane in his decision. Vane declared that the captain's decision is considered final and despite the overwhelming support for Rackham's cry to fight they fled the man-of-war.
On 24 November 1718, Rackham called a vote in which the men branded Vane a coward and removed him from the captaincy, making Calico Jack the next captain. Rackham gave Vane and his fifteen supporters the other ship in the fleet, along with a decent supply of ammunition and goods.

Captain Rackham
Rackham made a career of plundering small vessels close to shore once he became captain. He and his crew captured the Kingston, a small Jamaican vessel, and made it their flagship. They made several conquests in the West Indies, taking a couple of large ships off Bermuda. 

In 1719, Rackham sailed into Nassau in the Bahamas, taking advantage of a general amnesty for pirates to obtain a royal pardon and commission from Governor Woodes Rogers. Rogers had been sent to the Bahamas to address the problem of pirates in the Caribbean who had started to attack and steal from British ships.

In December, he captured the merchant ship Kingston. The Kingston had a rich cargo, and promised to be a big score for Rackham and his crew. Unfortunately for him, the Kingston had been taken within sight of Port Royal, where outraged merchants outfitted bounty hunters to go after him. They caught up with him in February 1719, while his ship and the Kingston were anchored at Isla de los Pinos off Cuba. Rackham and most of his men were on shore at the time, escaping capture by hiding in the woods, but their ship and rich trophy were taken away.

Captain Charles Johnson describes how Rackham stole a sloop in his seminal 1724 book A General History of the Robberies and Murders of the most notorious Pyrates. Rackham and his men were at a town in Cuba refitting their small sloop when a Spanish warship charged with patrolling the Cuban coast entered the harbour, along with a small English sloop which they had captured. The Spanish warship saw the pirates but could not get at them at low tide, so they anchored in the harbour entrance to wait for morning. That night, Rackham and his men rowed over to the captured English sloop and overpowered the Spanish guards there. As dawn broke, the warship began blasting Rackham's old ship, now empty, as Rackham and his men silently sailed past in their new prize.

Rackham and his men made their way back to Nassau, where they appeared before Governor Rogers and asked for the royal pardon, claiming that Vane had forced them to become pirates. Rogers hated Vane and chose to believe them, granting them the pardon and allowing them to stay. Their time as honest men, however, did not last long.

Anne Bonny
While in port, Rackham began an affair with Anne Bonny, wife of sailor James Bonny, who was employed by Governor Rogers. James Bonny learned about the relationship and brought Anne to Governor Rogers, who ordered her whipped on charges of adultery. Rackham offered to buy Anne in a "divorce by purchase", because he liked her, but her husband sternly refused. This caused Anne to flee Nassau and run away with Rackham. The pair (with a new crew) escaped to sea together, voiding Rackham's pardon, by stealing a sloop belonging to John Ham. They sailed the Caribbean for two months, taking over other pirate ships. Rackham would often invite the crew of ships that he attacked to join his own. Anne became pregnant and went home to Cuba to have the child.

Capture, trial and death

In September 1720, Bahamian Governor Woodes Rogers issued a proclamation declaring Rackham and his crew pirates—although it was not published until October 1720.  After publication of the warrant, pirate hunter Jonathan Barnet and former pirate Jean Bonadvis started in pursuit of Rackham, who was cruising near Jamaica capturing numerous small fishing vessels and terrorizing fishermen along the northern Jamaican coastline.

Rackham and his crew had been sailing west, towards Negril. On or around October 31, 1720 Rackham's sloop was laid at anchor and fired a gun which caught the attention of Jean Bonadvis' sloop. Bonadvis reported this to Barnet who sailed to investigate the sloop. At 10 PM Barnet called out to the sloop and inquired who they were. The reply was "John Rackham from Cuba" and Barnet immediately ordered him to strike his colors. Someone (Barnet testified that because of it being so dark he could not identify who) replied that they would not surrender and fired a swivel gun at Barnet's sloop. Barnet ordered a broadside which destroyed the boom on Rackham's ship and his crew called for quarter.

Barnet had the men put ashore at Davis's Cove near Lucea, Jamaica, where Major Richard James, a militia officer, placed them under arrest. Rackham and his crew were brought to Spanish Town, Jamaica, in November 1720, where they were tried and convicted of piracy and sentenced to be hanged.

Rackham was executed in Port Royal on 18 November 1720, his body then gibbeted on display on a very small islet at a main entrance to Port Royal now known as Rackham's Cay.

Fate of his crew
Anne Bonny and Mary Read both claimed to be pregnant at their trials, ten days after Rackham's execution, and so were given a temporary stay, and imprisoned at Fort Charles until the claim was proven. Read died in her cell in April 1721, most likely of fever related to childbirth. There is no historical record of Bonny's release or of her execution.

George Fetherston (Master), Richard Corner (Quarter-Master), John Davis, and John Howell were executed along with Jack Rackham in Port Royal. Patrick Carty, Thomas Earl, James Dobbin and Noah Harwood were executed the next day in Kingston.

The day after Rackham's trial, former crew members John "Old Dad the Cooper" Fenwick (alias "Fenis") and Thomas Bourn (alias Brown) were separately tried and convicted for mutinies committed in mid-June 1720 off Hispaniola.

Nine men who had been caught drinking with Rackham's crew (John Eaton, Edward Warner, Thomas Baker, Thomas Quick, John Cole, Benjamin Palmer, Walter Rouse, John Hanson, and John Howard) were tried and convicted on 24 January 1721. On 17 February John Eaton, Thomas Quick and Thomas Baker were executed at Gallows Point, at Port Royal, and the next day John Cole, John Howard and Benjamin Palmer, were executed at Kingston. The fate of the remaining three (Edward Warner, Walter Rouse and John Hanson) is unknown.

Jolly Roger flag

The flag commonly associated with Rackham depicts a white skull above crossed swords on a black background, and Rackham is sometimes credited with inventing or designing the Jolly Roger design. At trial, however, no witness described Rackham ever using such a flag, only noting that his sloop flew "a white pendant" (pennon). The skull-and-crossed-swords design likely dates to the early 20th century, and attaching it to Calico Jack can be traced to a 1959 book by Hans Leip.

In popular culture
 Jack Rackham is featured in the 2013 video game Assassin's Creed IV: Black Flag as a side character and minor antagonist who betrays Charles Vane and protagonist Edward Kenway by staging a mutiny after they capture a slave ship, leaving both of them stranded on a nearby island. He is later captured alongside Anne Bonnie and Mary Read, imprisoned, and eventually hanged. Kenway can find and interact with Rackham's skeleton during a mission, revealing that despite his actions, he still considered Rackham a friend.
 Jack Rackham is one of the major characters in the 2014 Starz television series Black Sails, portrayed by Toby Schmitz.
 Jack Rackham appears with Bonny and Read in the Audible serial podcast Hell Cats, by Carina Rodney.
 Jack is one of nine historical pirates to appear as enemies in Sid Meier's Pirates!
 Jack is one of sixteen historical pirates selectable as "Pirate King" in Tropico 2: Pirate Cove
 The German heavy metal band Running Wild released a song named "Calico Jack" on their 1988 album Port Royal.
 In the Octonauts stories and television series, Kwazii's grandfather is named Calico Jack.
 The pirate Red Rackham (in the Tintin story Red Rackham's Treasure) is likely named after John Rackham.
 In the manga One Piece, the character Calico Yorki is named after Calico Jack.
 In Our Flag Means Death, Calico Jack (played by Will Arnett) shows up as an old friend and ex-lover of Blackbeard's in episode 8.

Notes

References

Further reading
 Nelson, James L. (2004) A Short Life and A Merry One. Ithaca NY: McBooks.
 
 
 
 The entire trial transcript is available in the book The Pirate Trial of Anne Bonny and Mary Read by Tamara J. Eastman and Constance Bond
 Johnson, Captain Charles, A General History of the Pyrates: From their first rise and settlement in the island of Providence, to the present time. London: T. Warner. First published in 1724, with the second volume published 1728, both later attributed to Daniel Defoe. Note that the General History's details of the capture of the merchant ship Neptune by Charles Vane in September 1718 conflict with the court records of both Charles Vane and Robert Deal, his quartermaster.
 The Tryals of Captain John Rackam and Other Pirates, 1721, by Robert Baldwin, in The Colonial Office Records in The Public Records Office at Kew, (ref: CO 137/14f.9). This details the trials of Jack Rackam, Mary Read, Anne Bonny, and Charles Vane.

1682 births
1720 deaths
17th-century English people
18th-century English people
18th-century pirates
British pirates
English folklore
Pardoned pirates
Quartermasters
Executed English people
People executed for piracy
People executed by the Kingdom of Great Britain
People executed by the Colony of Jamaica by hanging
Burials at sea
Nicknames in crime